This is a list of episodes from the sixth season of the CBS-TV series Alice.

Episodes

Broadcast history
The season originally aired Sundays at 9:00-9:30 pm (EST).

References

1981 American television seasons
1982 American television seasons